John Jordan (25 February 1924 – 23 June 2007) was a Scottish professional footballer who played as an outside right in the Scottish League for Celtic and Queen's Park.

Career statistics

References 

Footballers from Glasgow
Scottish footballers
English Football League players
Scottish Football League players
1924 births
2007 deaths
Association football outside forwards
Reading F.C. players
Alloa Athletic F.C. players
Queen's Park F.C. players
Celtic F.C. players
Heart of Midlothian F.C. players
Pollok F.C. players
Edinburgh City F.C. (1928) players
Aberdeen F.C. players
Berwick Rangers F.C. players